Rid is both a given name and a surname. Notable people with the name include:

 Annette Rid, bioethicist and physician-scientist
 Rid Grachev (1935–2004), Soviet and Russian poet, writer, translator and essayist
 Samuel Rid, English writer
 Thomas Rid (born 1975), German political scientist